The Digital DawgPound (more commonly referred to as the "DDP") is a group of hackers, best known for a series of articles in hacker magazines such as 2600: The Hacker Quarterly and Make, the long-running webcast Binary Revolution Radio, and a very active set of forums with posts from high-profile hackers such as Strom Carlson, decoder, Phiber Optik and StankDawg. The stated mission of the DDP is to propagate a more positive image of hackers than the negative mass media stereotype.  The group welcomes new members who want to learn about hacking, and attempts to teach them more positive aspects and steer them away from the negative aspects, by reinforcing the hacker ethic.  Their goal is to show that hackers can, and regularly do, make positive contributions not only to technology, but to society as a whole.

History
The DDP was founded and named by StankDawg. His stated reasons were that he had made many friends in the hacking scene and thought that it would be useful to have everyone begin working together in a more organized fashion.  He was motivated by the fact that there had been other well known Hacker Groups in the 1980s who had accomplished great things in the hacking world such as the LoD and the MoD. In 1988, while a junior in high school, StankDawg came up with the name on his way to the "Sweet 16" computer programming competition. He jokingly referred to his teammates as "The Digital Dawgpound".

StankDawg lurked in the shadows of the hacking world for many years throughout college under many different pseudonyms.  In 1997 he popped his head out into the public and began becoming more active on IRC and many smaller hacking forums.  He saw some insanely brilliant people who seemed to have the same mindset and positive attitude towards hacking that he did, so he decided to approach a couple of them to see if they'd be interested. There was always a huge emphasis not only on technical competence and variety, but also on strength of character and integrity.  DDP members are good programmers and hackers, but more importantly, they're good people.  By 1999 the DDP had its first members and from this partnership, creativity flowed.

The DDP communicated and worked together on StankDawg's personal site, which was open to anyone who wanted to join in on the fun.  StankDawg was never comfortable with the fact that it was his name that was on the domain and that many people who were coming to the site were coming because of his articles or presentations but not really appreciating all of the other great community members that were around.  In 2002, after watching the web site grow quickly, it was decided that a new community needed to be created for these like-minded hackers who were gathering.  This was the start of the biggest DDP project called Binary Revolution which was an attempt at starting a true "community" of hackers.  As the site grew, so did the DDP roster.

Members
Over the years, DDP membership has included several staff writers for 2600: The Hacker Quarterly and Blacklisted! 411 magazine including StankDawg and bland_inquisitor.  They frequently publish articles, provide content, and appear on many media sources across the global Interweb.  DDP members are also regular speakers at hacking conferences such as DEF CON, H.O.P.E., and Interzone.

The majority of DDP members are college graduates and have professional experience in the computer industry.  Some work for Fortune 500 companies, while others have been entrepreneurs who have created successful businesses.  They hold memberships in Mensa and the International High IQ society.

Binary Revolution
The best known of the DDP projects is that of Binary Revolution, or "BinRev".  This project was created in an attempt to bring the hacking community back together, working towards a common, positive goal of reclaiming the name of hackers.  The Binary Revolution emphasizes positive aspects of hacking and projects that help society.  It does this in a variety of outlets including monthly meetings, the weekly radio show Binary Revolution Radio(BRR), a video-based series of shows called HackTV, and very active message board forums.

Binary Revolution Radio, often shortened to "BRR", is one small part of the binrev community.  It is common for people to discover BRR on one of the many podcast sites or applications out there and not realize that the "Binary Revolution" refers to a larger community than just the radio show.  When people refer to "BinRev" they should not be referring only to the radio show.  They should be referring to the community of projects as a whole, specifically focusing on the forums.

Recognition
The DDP maintains a blog "which they refer to as a "blawg". Posts by DDP members have been featured on other technology-related sites such as those of Make Magazine,
HackADay,
Hacked Gadgets, and others.

Works

Printed 
 Natas - "Backspoofing 101", Spring 2007, 2600 Magazine
 Natas - "Ownage by AdSense", Fall 2006, 2600 Magazine
 Black Ratchet - "Not Quite Dead Yet", Spring 2006, 2600 Magazine
 dual_parallel - "Port Knocking Simplified", Winter 2005, Blacklisted411 Magazine
 StankDawg - "The Art of Electronic Deduction", Winter 2005, Blacklisted411 Magazine
 dual_parallel - "Remote Encrypted Data Access", Fall 2005, Blacklisted411 Magazine
 StankDawg - "Stupid Webstats Tricks", Fall 2005, 2600 Magazine
 StankDawg - "Hacking Google AdWords", Summer 2005, 2600 Magazine
 StankDawg - "Disposable Email Vulnerabilities", Spring 2005, 2600 Magazine
 StankDawg - "0wning Universal Studios Florida", Fall 2004, Blacklisted411 Magazine
 StankDawg - "How to Hack The Lottery", Fall 2004, 2600 Magazine
 StankDawg - "Robots and Spiders", Winter 2003, 2600 Magazine
 ntheory - "Backspoofing: Let the Telco Do the Walking", July 2004, BR magazine Issue 2.1
 ntheory - "Packet8 IP Phone service", July 2004, BR magazine Issue 2.1
 dual_parallel - "White Hat Wi-Fi", July 2004, BR magazine Issue 2.1
 hacnslash - "An IR receiver for your PC", July 2004, BR magazine Issue 2.1
 StankDawg - "Hacking 101:  Directory Transversal", July 2004, BR magazine Issue 2.1
 ntheory - "Hacking Coinstar", September 2003, BR magazine Issue 1.2
 w1nt3rmut3 - "Best buy insecurities: revisited", September 2003, BR magazine Issue 1.2
 bland_inquisitor - "Kismet on Knoppix HD install", September 2003, BR magazine Issue 1.2
 dual_parallel - "A Physical Security Primer for the Community", September 2003, BR magazine Issue 1.2
 logan5 - "case modeling", September 2003, BR magazine Issue 1.2
 vooduHAL - "Insecurities in my cafe cup", September 2003, BR magazine Issue 1.2
 StankDawg - "Hacking 101:  Targeting Theory", September 2003, BR magazine Issue 1.2
 bland_inquisitor - "Denial of Service Attacks, Tools of the Tools", May 2003, BR magazine and Fall 2003, 2600 Magazine Issue 1.1
 StankDawg - "Hacking 101: Footprinting a system", May 2003, BR magazine Issue 1.1
 evo_tech - "Your rights and why you have already lost them", May 2003, BR magazine Issue 1.1
 nick84 & StankDawg - "2600 Secrets", May 2003, BR magazine Issue 1.1
 nick84 - "Watching the watchers", May 2003, BR magazine Issue 1.1
 dual_parallel - "Public TTYs: Description and Methodologies for Free Calling", May 2003, BR magazine Issue 1.1
 bland_inquisitor - "Cookies:  The good, the bad, and the ugly", May 2003, BR magazine Issue 1.1
 StankDawg - "A newbies guide to ghettodriving", May 2003, BR magazine Issue 1.1
 w1nt3rmut3 - "Phreaking Italy", May 2003, BR magazine Issue 1.1
 w1nt3rmut3 - "Best Buy Insecurities", Spring 2003, 2600 Magazine
 bland_inquisitor - "Honeypots: Building the Better Hacker", Winter 2002, 2600 Magazine
 StankDawg - "A History of 31337sp34k", Fall 2002, 2600 Magazine
 bland_inquisitor - "Telezapper, Telemarketers, and the TCPA", Fall 2002, 2600 Magazine
 dual_parallel - "Retail Hardware Revisited", Spring 2002, 2600 Magazine
 StankDawg - "Transaction Based Systems", Spring 2002, 2600 Magazine
 dual_parallel - "Hacking Retail Hardware", Fall 2001, 2600 Magazine
 StankDawg - "Batch vs. Interactive", Summer 1999, 2600 Magazine

Online 
 StankDawg - "Wardriving with Mickey", October 2005
 dual_parallel & bland_inquisitor - "Slackware 10.2 Tips", September 2005
 logan5 - "The iPod: It's not just for music anymore", January 2005
 bland_inquisitor - "Kodak Picture Maker: In's and Out's", December 2004
 StankDawg - "Hackers Insomnia", October 2004, Frequency zine
 dual_parallel & bland_inquisitor - "Basic Slackware Security", April 2004
 StankDawg - "Scanning GO.MSN.COM", May 2004, Radical Future zine Issue #5
 StankDawg - "Fun with the dnL flipit chatbot", December 2003, Outbreak zine issue #14
 StankDawg & bi0s - "Inside Circuit City", December 2003, Outbreak zine issue #14
 hacnslash - "Dumpster Diving - Art or Science?", September 23, 2003
 bland_inquisitor - "Social Insecurity", December 2003, Radical Future zine Issue #4
 ntheory - "Generating Millisecond Accurate, Multi-Frequency Wave Files in Perl", July 2003
 StankDawg - "DMCA vs googlefight.com", December 2002, Outbreak zine issue #12
 StankDawg - "Basic Directory Transversal", November 2002, Outbreak zine issue #11
 StankDawg - "Hacking Movies", Winter 2002, Radical Future zine Issue #3
 StankDawg - "AIM Transcript (Campaign For Freedom)", Winter 2002, Radical Future zine Issue #3

Presentations 
 StankDawg - "Binary Revolution Radio - Season 4 live!", July 2006, H.O.P.E. Number Six
 StankDawg - "The Art of Electronic Deduction", March 2006, Interz0ne 5 and July 2006, H.O.P.E. Number Six
 StankDawg - "Hacking Google AdWords", July 2005, DEF CON 13
 Black Ratchet (with Strom Carlson) - "Be Your Own Telephone Company...With Asterisk", July 2005, DEF CON 13
 StankDawg - "Hacker Radio", July 2004, The fifth H.O.P.E. (guest panelist)
 StankDawg - "AS/400: Lifting the veil of obscurity", July 2004, The fifth H.O.P.E.
 StankDawg - "Disposable Email vulnerabilities", March 2004, Interz0ne 4
jagan rider twg - "Binary Revolution Radio - Season 4 live!", July 2006, H.O.P.E. Number Six StankDawg - "The Art of Electronic Deduction", March 2006, Interz0ne 5 and July 2006, H.O.P.E. Number Sixhe haker as the mobiltnfounsinsniuiuuyttyukkkuad''

Notes

External links

DDP projects
The Digital DawgPound Weblog
The Binary Revolution - The main site of the DDP founded hacking community
Binary Revolution Magazine - The printed hacking magazine put out by the DDP
Binary Revolution Radio - Weekly hacking radio show presented by members of the DDP (07/2003-current)
Binary Revolution Meetings - Monthly hacker meetings that encourage participation and offers free hosting for all meetings
DDP HackRadio - The streaming radio station from the DDP that offer shows that are, "All hacking, all the time"
HackTV - The first full-length regular Hacking video show
Hacker Events - A calendar for all hacking conferences, events, meetings, or other related gatherings
Hacker Media - A portal for all hacking, phreaking, and other related media shows
Old Skool Phreak - Home of many phreaking related text files and Radio FreeK America archives
Phreak Phactor - The world's first Hacking reality radio show
Project Wal+Mart Freedom - A comprehensive directory of all things the great devil of consumerism, Wal+Mart, has to offer phreaks and hackers
Radio FreeK America - Weekly Radio show about Technology, Privacy and Freedom (02/2002 - 02/2004)
Will Hack For Food - Secure disposable temporary email accounts

Hacker groups